Clutter Nutters is a children's TV show produced by Ricochet in 2006 for the CBBC Channel, where two contestants battle it out to win a prize and at the same time, tidy their bedrooms. The programme has many steps:

Guide and aims 
 Clear all the clutter from contestants bedrooms.
 Weigh all the cleared items
 Separate clutter into piles which you want to keep (Love it) or get rid of (Lose it).
 Complete tasks in which you have to reduce the Lose It pile, e.g. selling at a market, holding a yard sale or using a computer to hold an internet auction.
 Put what you weren't able to get rid of into another two piles – one to be recycled and one to donate
 Whatever is unusable (e.g. old colouring books or broken toys) is thrown away (into Colin the Dustbin, a 'clutter compactor').
 Contestants weigh their remaining items.
 Whichever contestant has lost the most 'clutter' wins a prize, usually tickets to the theatre, football game or other recreational outing.
 Both contestants are shown their new rooms which have been redecorated by the presenters – regardless of whether they want it or not.

Forfeits include two 5 kg teddy bears which are awarded to the contestants who sells or donates the least amount of clutter

Selling
Each team must battle it out to raise the most money and avoid the 5 kg teddies. Selling usually includes online auctions, car boot sales, yard sales, auctions or going to a market.

Recycle and Donate
This is the part of the show when you're given three minutes to sort the rest of your lose it piles into things you can recycle and things you can donate. The contestant with the least amount of things gets the second 5 kg teddy.

Weigh-in
There are two weigh-ins. The first weigh-in is when you weigh all your clutter from your bedrooms. It usually gets compared to an animal such as a panda or a jaguar. The final weigh-in is when you put your love it piles on the scales which tells you who has won.

Prizes

The winner gets a prize which is usually something like a ticket to a football match. Both winner and runner-up get a surprise bedroom makeover.

Characters
 Colin: a dustbin
 5 kg teddies: your forfeits

Mini Clutter Nutters
Mini Clutter Nutters is a cut down version of the show which is usually giving you top selling tips.

Presenters
Nigel Clarke
Hannah Sandling

Episodes
 Oscar and Alabama
 Lucy and Yasmin
 Kieran and Amber
 Mariatou and Yassin
 Kirstie and Daniel
 Tara and Bethan
 Ellie and Chris
 Chloe and Callum
 Jessica and Sophie
 Olivia and Ellie
 Adam and Alex
 Keely and Jessica
 Alfie and Luke
 Tom and Emily
 Tom and Olivia

External links
 

2006 British television series debuts
2000s British children's television series
BBC children's television shows
British children's game shows